Bridget & Eamon is an Irish sitcom that first aired on RTÉ Two on 1 February 2016, having previously aired as a RTÉ Player-exclusive series. It is based on the Bridget & Eamon sketches that featured on the Republic of Telly comedy review show. The show centres on 1980s husband and wife played by Bernard O'Shea and Jennifer Zamparelli.

The show won the IFTA for Best Comedy at the IFTA GALA Television 2016 awards. The show's director Jason Butler also won the IFTA for Best Director Soap / Comedy.

It was the first comedy funded entirely by the Irish state broadcaster RTÉ to screen in Britain.

It is produced with the support of investment incentives for the Irish Film Industry provided by the Government of Ireland, and filmed on location in Ireland.

Plot 
Bridget and Eamon are an unhappily married 1980s Irish couple. They live in the Irish Midlands with their indeterminate number (6 to 8) of children. The series follows their lives.

Cast

Main cast
 Jennifer Maguire as Bridget  
 Bernard O'Shea as Eamon  
 Edwin Sammon as Father Gabriel  
 Norma Sheahan as Noreen  
 Sharon Mannion as Concepta  
 Laura O'Mahony as Grainne  
 Eleanor Tiernan as Dolores  
 Colum McDonnell as Frank  
 Neil Molloy as Garda Paul  
 Danny Kehoe as Garda Ger
 John Colleary	as Jimmy
 Patrick McDonnell as Martin
 Kevin Barry as Donal
 Keith Walsh as Phelim

Episodes

Season 1

Season 2

Season 3

Season 4

References

External links

2010s sitcoms
2016 Irish television series debuts
English-language television shows
Irish comedy television shows
Fictional married couples
Television series about cousins
Television series about dysfunctional families
Television series about marriage
Television series about siblings
Television series set in the 1980s
RTÉ original programming